Sam Naismith (born 16 July 1992) was a former Ruckman for the Sydney Swans. He is currently signed to the  Port Melbourne Football Club in the Victorian Football League (VFL).

Early life and junior football
Naismith was born in Narrabri, New South Wales but moved to Gunnedah with his family at a young age. He grew up playing rugby league and supported the Parramatta Eels in the National Rugby League. He first played Australian rules football at the age of 16 when a school friend convinced him to take part in a few training sessions with the Gunnedah Bulldogs. A year later, as a 17-year-old, he was named joint best and fairest winner of the Tamworth Australian Football League in 2009. By 2011 Naismith was ready to quit Aussie rules and move to Sydney to play rugby union until then-Sydney Swans coach Paul Roos called him and invited him to join the Swans' talent academy. Naismith accepted the invitation and began playing for the North Shore Bombers in the Sydney AFLcompetition in 2012. By the end of the season he was rookie drafted by the Swans.

AFL & VFL career
Naismith made his debut for the Swans in the final round of 2014 season against Richmond. Naismith carried the ruck duties alone that day as Mike Pyke and Tom Derickx were both injured.

On the 6th December 2022 Sam was delisted by the Swans and signed for VFL side  Port Melbourne Football Club. He will play for them in 2023.

Statistics
Updated to the end of the 2022 season.

|-
| 2014 ||  || 35
| 1 || 0 || 0 || 0 || 6 || 6 || 1 || 3 || 16 || 0.0 || 0.0 || 0.0 || 6.0 || 6.0 || 1.0 || 3.0 || 16.0
|- 
| 2015 ||  || 35
| 0 || — || — || — || — || — || — || — || — || — || — || — || — || — || — || — || —
|-
| 2016 ||  || 35
| 12 || 3 || 1 || 42 || 68 || 110 || 25 || 39 || 277 || 0.3 || 0.1 || 3.5 || 5.7 || 9.2 || 2.1 || 3.3 || 23.1
|-
| 2017 ||  || 35
| 15 || 0 || 3 || 52 || 81 || 133 || 25 || 40 || 419 || 0.0 || 0.2 || 3.5 || 5.4 || 8.9 || 1.7 || 2.7 || 27.9
|- 
| 2018 ||  || 35
| 0 || — || — || — || — || — || — || — || — || — || — || — || — || — || — || — || —
|- 
| 2019 ||  || 35
| 0 || — || — || — || — || — || — || — || — || — || — || — || — || — || — || — || —
|- 
| 2020 ||  || 10
| 2 || 0 || 0 || 15 || 4 || 19 || 5 || 9 || 53 || 0.0 || 0.0 || 7.5 || 2.0 || 9.5 || 2.5 || 4.5 || 26.5
|- 
| 2021 ||  || 10
| 0 || — || — || — || — || — || — || — || — || — || — || — || — || — || — || — || —
|- 
| 2022 ||  || 10
| 0 || — || — || — || — || — || — || — || — || — || — || — || — || — || — || — || —
|- class=sortbottom
! colspan=3 | Career
! 30 !! 3 !! 4 !! 109 !! 159 !! 268 !! 56 !! 91 !! 765 !! 0.1 !! 0.1 !! 3.6 !! 5.3 !! 8.9 !! 1.9 !! 3.0 !! 25.5
|}

Honours and achievements
Team
 McClelland Trophy: 2016

References

External links

Living people
1994 births
Sydney Swans players
Australian rules footballers from New South Wales
North Shore Australian Football Club players